The Pin Parbati Pass (also written Pin Parvati Pass) is a mountain pass in Himachal Pradesh, India, at . It was first crossed in August 1884 by Sir Louis Dane in search of an alternate route to the Spiti valley. This pass connects the fertile and lush Parbati valley on the Kullu side with the barren high-altitude Pin valley on the Spiti side.

It is a popular trekking route today.  The trek route starts from Mud village on the Spiti side.  An Army expedition attempted the 155 km route in 2013.

See also
Borasu pass
Rupin Pass
Saach Pass
Takling La (Pass)
Pin Valley National Park

References

Mountain passes of Himachal Pradesh
Geography of Kullu district
Geography of Lahaul and Spiti district